Mathew "Mat" Harris is a Canadian curler.

Teams

Personal life
His brother Rob is a curler too, and played lead on the Mark Dacey Brier champion team (Mathew was many times the alternate on this team). Harris works as the Regional Managing Partner of Deloitte's Atlantic region. In 2015, he chaired the host committee at the 2015 World Men's Curling Championship.

References

External links
 
 Mathew Harris – Curling Canada Stats Archive

Living people

Canadian male curlers
Curlers from Nova Scotia
Brier champions
Sportspeople from Halifax, Nova Scotia
Year of birth missing (living people)